Kenneth Herbert (27 December 1924 – 3 March 2011) was an Australian rules footballer who played with Collingwood in the Victorian Football League (VFL).

Notes

External links 

Profile on Collingwood Forever

		
2011 deaths		
1924 births		
		
Australian rules footballers from Victoria (Australia)		
Collingwood Football Club players
Sturt Football Club players
Royal Australian Air Force personnel of World War II
Royal Australian Air Force airmen